The DRB Class 42 was a type of steam locomotive produced for the Deutsche Reichsbahn. It is one of the three main classes of the so-called war locomotives (Kriegslokomotiven), the other two being class 50 and 52.

Seventy of the class were captured during World War II by the Soviet Union; under Russian ownership they were given the classification TL (ТЛ).

History 
These engines, built from 1943 onwards, were the second heavy locomotive class of this type after the DRG Class 52. They were built for duties on routes that were cleared for a higher axle load, because they were more economical there than the  KDL 1 Kriegslokomotiven of Class 52. In principle they were slimmed down 44s. The Class 42 was procured as Kriegslokomotive KDL 3.

The total of 859 units had a number of improvements to the driving and running gear. Originally it was intended to build very large numbers of these engines, but the end of the Second World War put paid to that. A condenser locomotive, based on the Class 42 was also planned, but did not come to fruition.

At the end of the war there were still half-finished engines in the workshops. So after 1945, 16 engines were built for the Reichsbahn in the western zone by the Maschinenfabrik Esslingen ('Esslingen Locomotive Works'). 126 engines were built by Polish factories for the  PKP in Poland as Class Ty43 and three ex DRG engines also went over to the PKP as Class Ty3. Another 76 units were produced by the Lokomotivfabrik Floridsdorf in Vienna. These were not built for the Austrian Federal Railways (ÖBB), but were sold in 1949 to the CFL in Luxembourg - 20 engines (CFL class 55), in 1952 to Bulgarian State Railways (BDZ) - 33 pcs (BDZ class 16). and the rest to DR and various industrial enterprises in East Germany.

The majority of the locomotives that ended up in the Deutsche Bundesbahn were stationed in the Saarland. These were taken out of service by 1960. The engines with the DR continued to work until 1968, and these with BDZ until 1988. Nowadays (2015) there are only two engines in operation - CFL 5519 and BDZ 16.27 (in service since April 2015). They are used for special and tourist trains. Another operational BDZ engine 16.01 is retired since 2013.

The DB and DR locomotives had operating numbers 42 001–2810 and 42 5000. However they did not run consecutively and there were gaps.

The engines were mainly equipped with 2'2' T 30 or 2'2' T 32 tenders.

DB Class 42.90 (Franco-Crosti locomotive) 

In 1952, the firm of Henschel rebuilt locomotives 52 893 and 52 894 with Franco-Crosti economisers (Abgasvorwärmer). Because of the resulting higher axle load, the engines were classified by the Deutsche Bundesbahn as Class 42.90 locomotives and given the operating numbers 42 9000 and 42 9001.

Engine number 42 9000 was stabled in Bingerbrück and retired in 1959. In 1960 the second one, stationed in Oberlahnstein, was taken out of service. The experience accumulated with these very economical locomotives was used in the 31 engines of Class 50.40.

Both locomotives were coupled with 2'2' T 30 tenders.

Notes

See also
 List of DRG locomotives and railbuses
 The Museum of the Moscow Railway, at Paveletsky Rail Terminal, Moscow
 Rizhsky Rail Terminal, Home of the Moscow Railway Museum
 Varshavsky Rail Terminal, St.Petersburg, Home of the Central Museum of Railway Transport, Russian Federation
 History of rail transport in Russia

References

External links 

 Section diagram and technical data for the Class 42

42
2-10-0 locomotives
42
Railway locomotives introduced in 1943
Floridsdorf locomotives
Standard gauge locomotives of Germany
1′E h2 locomotives
Freight locomotives